Antennaria howellii (everlasting or Howell's pussytoes) is a North American species in the genus Antennaria within the family Asteraceae.  It is native to northern Alaska, much of Canada including the Arctic territories, and the northern United States as far south as northern California, Colorado and North Carolina.

Antennaria howellii is an evergreen perennial plant. The form is usually basal rosettes, largely clonally propagated. The basal rosette leaves are 2–4 cm long and 6–12 mm broad, light green and spatulate, with a thin arm and a broad tip with a point. They have woolly white undersides. The flowerheads appear in May, on a stem 15–35 cm tall with smaller, slender leaves 1–4 cm long. It is commonly seen growing under pine stands.

Subspecies
Antennaria howellii subsp. howellii – western + north-central US, western + central Canada including Yukon
Antennaria howellii subsp. canadensis – northeastern US, eastern + central Canada including Labrador
Antennaria howellii subsp. neodioica – Canada, northern US
Antennaria howellii subsp. petaloidea – Canada, northern US

The plant is named for American botanist Thomas J. Howell, who collected the first known specimens of the plant in 1887.

Conservation status in the United States
The petaloidea subspecies is listed as a special concern and believed extirpated in Connecticut.

Native American ethnobotany
The Nuxalk Nation take a decoction of leaves for body pain, but not pain in the limbs. The Ojibwe take an infusion of the neodioica subspecies   after childbirth to purge afterbirth and to heal.

References

External links

United States Department of Agriculture Plants Profile: Antennaria howellii
Plants of British Columbia: Antennaria howellii
Jepson Flora Project: Antennaria howellii

howellii
Plants described in 1897
Plants used in traditional Native American medicine
Flora of Canada
Flora of the United States